Eurypteryx dianae is a moth of the family Sphingidae which is known from Guangxi in China.

It is similar to Eurypteryx geoffreyi. There is a small round stigma and greyish semicircular marginal area on the forewing upperside and a round yellowish discal spot on the forewing underside. Here, a dark brown almost straight submarginal line is also present, separating the lighter marginal area from the darker rest of the wing. The hindwing underside has a dark brown postmedian line.

References

dianae
Moths described in 2006
Endemic fauna of Guangxi
Moths of Asia